The 2015–16 Texas Southern Tigers basketball team represented Texas Southern University during the 2015–16 NCAA Division I men's basketball season. The Tigers, led by fourth year head coach Mike Davis, played pik home games at the Health and Physical Education Arena and were members of the Southwestern Athletic Conference. They finished the season 18–15, 16–2 in SWAC play to win the regular season SWAC championship. They defeated Alabama A&M in the quarterfinals of the SWAC tournament to advance to the semifinals where they lost to Southern. As regular season conference champions who failed to win their conference tournament, they received an automatic bid to the National Invitation Tournament where they lost to Valparaiso in the first round.

Previous season 
The Tigers finished the 2014–15 season with a record of 22–13, 16–2 in conference and winners of the SWAC regular season and Tournament. By winning the tournament, they received the conference's automatic bid to the NCAA tournament where they lost in the second round to Arizona.

Roster

Source

Schedule

|-
! colspan="9" style=| Regular season

 

|-
! colspan="9" style=| SWAC tournament

|-
! colspan="9" style=| NIT

References

Texas Southern Tigers basketball seasons
Texas Southern
Texas Southern Tigers basketball
Texas Southern Tigers basketball
Texas Southern